The Undertaker (also released as Death Merchant) is a 1988 American slasher film directed by Franco Steffanino and starring Joe Spinell. The film was completed in November 1988, but was never released for the public and existed only in an incomplete form. The Undertaker was later reedited for a DVD release by Code Red in 2010 and a Blu-ray release by Vinegar Syndrome in 2016. The film is considered a cult classic, due in part to both Joe Spinell's involvement and its troubled production. This was Joe Spinell's last film before his premature death in 1989.

Premise 
The mortician Uncle Roscoe (Joe Spinell) attends community college by day and murders women for his personal use. His nephew Nicky, his professor Pam (Rebeca Yaron) and her roommate Mandy (Susan Bachli) begin to suspect Roscoe, unaware that the undertaker has now taken a special interest in them.

Cast
 Joe Spinell as Roscoe
 Rebeca Yaron as Pam Hayes
 Susan Bachli as Mandy
 Martha Somoeman as Hazel
 Charles Kay-Hune as Police Chief
 William James Kennedy as Inspector Barry
 France Porta as Security Guard
 Joe Magle as Kevin
 Max Stone as Sergeant
 Ginny Franco as Mary Lawrence
 Lisa Vondal as Nancy Bowen
 Rita Kling as Angela
 Jan Harrison as Cashier
 Mette Holt as Jean
 Robert Kessler as Inspector Vance
 Guillermo Gentile as State Coroner
 Tommy LoRusso as Coroner Driver

Production 
The film was made on location in Port Chester, New York at the former Colony Funeral Home on King Street and was produced by Double Helix Films. Filming for The Undertaker was completed in November 1988.

Release 
The film was never released to theatres or to video, and the only known copy belonged to Joe Spinell, who died not long afterward. The film circulated as a bootleg for years, before Code Red released an edited version of the film on DVD in October 2010. The release was padded with public domain films to increase running time, was titled Death Merchant in the opening titles, and scenes were both cut and rearranged from the bootleg version.

In 2016, Vinegar Syndrome restored and released The Undertaker in a Blu-ray/DVD combo pack limited to 3,000 copies. Unlike the Code Red release, the Vinegar Syndrome version does not include the public domain films edited in to pad the running time.

References

External links

1988 films
American slasher films
1988 horror films
1980s slasher films
Funeral homes in fiction
Films shot in New York (state)
1980s English-language films
1980s American films